Acrocercops irrorata is a moth of the family Gracillariidae. It is known from Australia in the states of New South Wales, South Australia and Queensland.

References

irrorata
Moths of Australia
Moths described in 1894